Amorbia chlorolyca is a species of moth of the family Tortricidae. It is found in southern Brazil, where it is found at altitudes between 69 and 500 meters.

The length of the forewings is 8–9.8 mm for males and 10-11.2 mm for females. The ground colour of the forewings is straw yellow, with a discontinuous line of dark brown scales between median and postmedian area. The hindwings are also straw yellow. Adults have been recorded on wing every month of the year except March, April and September.

References

Moths described in 1931
Sparganothini
Moths of South America